Guillermo Coria defeated Agustín Calleri in the final, 6–3, 6–4, 6–4 to win the singles tennis title at the 2003 Hamburg European Open.

Roger Federer was the defending champion, but lost in the third round to Mark Philippoussis.

Seeds
A champion seed is indicated in bold text while text in italics indicates the round in which that seed was eliminated.

  Lleyton Hewitt (third round)
  Carlos Moyá (second round)
  Roger Federer (third round)
  Andy Roddick (second round)
  Albert Costa (second round)
  Jiří Novák (first round)
  Paradorn Srichaphan (first round)
  David Nalbandian (semifinals)
  Rainer Schüttler (third round)
  Sébastien Grosjean (second round)
  Gustavo Kuerten (third round)
  Guillermo Coria (champion)
  Àlex Corretja (first round)
  Tommy Robredo (second round)
  Fernando González (quarterfinals)
  James Blake (first round)

Draw

Finals

Top half

Section 1

Section 2

Bottom half

Section 3

Section 4

References
 2003 Hamburg Masters Draw

2003 ATP Tour